Ahmad Toure Ngouyamsa Nounchil (born 21 December 2000) is a Cameroonian professional footballer who plays as a defender for Ligue 2 club Dijon and the Cameroon national team.

Professional career
Ngouyamsa made his professional debut with Dijon in a 1-0 Ligue 1 win over Lille OSC on 12 January 2020.

International career
Ngouyamsa represented the Cameroon U17s at the 2017 Africa U-17 Cup of Nations. Ngouyamsa made his debut with the Cameroon national team in a friendly 0-0 tie with Japan on 9 October 2020.

References

External links
 
 

2000 births
Living people
Footballers from Yaoundé
Cameroonian footballers
Cameroon international footballers
Cameroon youth international footballers
Dijon FCO players
Ligue 1 players
Championnat National 3 players
Association football defenders
Cameroonian expatriate footballers